Spacehunter: Adventures in the Forbidden Zone is a 1983 American-Canadian space Western film. The film stars Peter Strauss, Molly Ringwald, Ernie Hudson, Andrea Marcovicci and Michael Ironside. The film's executive producer was Ivan Reitman, and it was directed by Lamont Johnson. The film's music score was composed by Elmer Bernstein. When the film was originally released in theaters it was shown in a polarized, over/under 3-D format. The film became part of the 3-D film revival craze of the early 1980s, being widely released after Comin' at Ya! (1981). The film is about a bounty hunter who goes on a mission to rescue three women stranded on a brutal planet and meets a vagrant teenage girl along the way.

Plot
Set in the early 22nd century, the film opens with the destruction of a space cruise liner by a bolt of nebular lightning. The only apparent survivors are three beautiful women — Nova, Reena, and Meagan — who abscond in an escape pod and land on the nearest habitable planet. There, they are quickly accosted by the hostile natives and taken aboard a sail-driven vehicle resembling a pirate ship on rails.

In space, an alert is broadcast for the safe return of the women with a reward of 3,000 mega-credits. A small-time salvage operator named Wolff intercepts the message and heads to the planet. Joining him is his female engineer Chalmers, who learns that the planet, Terra XI, is a failed colony that fell victim to a deadly plague and civil warfare. Wolff risks the dangers, believing that the reward will solve his debt problems.

After landing on the barren world, Wolff and Chalmers set out in a four-wheel-drive vehicle called the Scrambler. Soon, they join a battle in progress between a group of marauders (called the Zoners) and a band of nomads (the Scavs). The Zoners take the women before Wolff can stop them and fly away on jet-powered hang gliders. Wolff learns from the Scavs that the women were taken into The Zone which is ruled by Overdog, their sworn enemy. Returning to the Scrambler, Wolff finds that Chalmers — revealed to be a gynoid — has been killed. Wolff continues alone, but he soon catches a teenage Scav, Niki, trying to steal his Scrambler. She convinces Wolff that he needs a tracker if he is to survive The Zone, and Wolff reluctantly takes her lead.

In the meantime, the three women are taken before The Chemist, the chief henchman of Overdog who administers pacifying drugs to the women and prepares them for Overdog's pleasure. Overdog is a hideous cyborg with giant metal claws for hands.

Elsewhere, Wolff and Niki make camp, but soon come under attack by a strange plow-like vehicle. Wolff manages to disable the machine and learns the driver is a former military acquaintance of his, a soldier named Washington, who reveals that he, too, has come to rescue the women. His only problem is that he crashed his ship and has no way off of the planet. Wolff refuses to help his rival and leaves him to fend for himself.

Still led by Niki, Wolff gets into more predicaments — from being attacked by mutated humanoids, to strange Amazon-like women and a water dragon (which the Amazon-like women fear). He loses his trusty Scrambler and is forced to continue on foot. Eventually, they are found by Washington, and Wolff finds the situation reversed as he now begs his rival for help. They agree to a 50/50 split of the reward.

Now a team, Wolff and Washington sneak into Overdog's fortress, where they find the Zoners entertained by captured prisoners forced to run through a deadly maze of lethal obstacles, hazards and traps. Wolff spots the women being held in a cage and forms a rescue plan, but a bored Niki (who was left out of the rescue for her safety) decides to snoop around. She is captured and sent into the maze. Wolff spots Niki in the maze and tries to rescue her, but she uses her prowess to reach the end. Overdog congratulates her and drags her back to his lair. There, she is hooked to a machine that slowly drains her life energy. The energy, in turn, recharges Overdog.

Wolff comes to the rescue and jabs a sparking power cable into one of Overdog's claws. The power feedback fries Overdog and thus causes cascading blowouts throughout the entire fortress. As the fortress explodes around them, Wolff and Niki run for cover and are rescued by the timely arrival of Washington, who is driving the plow machine with Nova, Reena and Meagan driving another commandeered vehicle. They all race out of the fortress just as it explodes behind them.

Wolff invites Niki to stay with him, and she agrees since they made good partners.

Main cast
 Peter Strauss as Wolff
 Molly Ringwald as Niki
 Ernie Hudson as Washington
 Andrea Marcovicci as Chalmers
 Michael Ironside as Overdog McNabb
 Beeson Carroll as Grandman Patterson
 Hrant Alianak as The Chemist
 Deborah Pratt as Meagan
 Aleisa Shirley as Reena
 Cali Timmins as Nova
 Reggie Bennett as Barracuda Leader
 Harold Ramis as Voice On Intercom (Uncredited)

Production

Development
The film, which was announced in February 1982, was one of a number of 3D films made in the wake of the success of the Spanish-American 3D Western film Comin at Ya. Ernie McNab, the 3D designer on this film, said the effects would enable the audience to "really feel space". Producer Don Carmody said, "We never stop to pop popcorn in your face. We do have one scene where laser beams and flame-blasters are bombarding the audience fast and furious, but these effects occur during a battle scene and appear valid." In 2015 Reitman said: "We had to have two cameras. We just shot it in what is now called “native” 3-D, and it was hell. And there were no screens that you could show it in. That was not really a practical idea in 1981."

Casting
Ernie Hudson says when he was first cast he was told Jeff Bridges would play Wolff. Then Peter Strauss was cast in the role.

Filming
Filming started under the title Adventures in the Creep Zone in October 1982. The original director was Jean LaFleur who had co written the original story and previously worked with producer Don Carmody. However, after only two weeks of filming, LaFelur and several other crew members were fired, reportedly because Columbia was unhappy with the film's progress. His replacement was Lamont Johnson.

Strauss said this led to changes to his character. "There were attempts to make him a little less tough and a little more gentle and responsive to the girl, Niki. Some of his grittiness in the earlier version was replaced with a notion of more gentleness." "It was difficult because things were always changing," said Hudson. "We changed the script entirely. When Lamont came in, we got a new script, a new everything. I ended up really liking Lamont. But it was very confusing, especially in the beginning."

Molly Ringwald said "I was always attracted to the character. The script was pretty — uh — but I figured that maybe I could change the dialogue a little when I got there. As it turned out, they were desperate to change the dialogue. I was quite relieved when Lamont showed up and said, 'This is awwwful. Let's change all this!' The script was re-written a lot. There was a train which started out as evil and wound up being good. People who were supposed to be friends ended up being enemies. It was confusing. I was lucky, though. All my material was improved."

Hudson felt the movie "was a real stretch for" Strauss "and the confusion didn't help [...] Wolff was a wonderful, Harrison  Ford type, but that's not Peter. An actor has to take it his own way and do something totally different. Unfortunately, you're working with people who want the Harrison Ford thing, and they want it from you [...] Peter had to carry his first big feature through all that confusion, and it was very difficult."

Parts of the film were shot in Kane Creek, Bull Canyon, Colorado River, Potash, Lower Shafer Trail, Potash Settling Ponds, Grey Hills, U.S. Highway 91, and the area south of Canyonlands Airport. It was also shot in Vancouver.

Soundtrack
The film's music was done by Elmer Bernstein who later called the film "too rushed. The studio's only concern was getting it to the box office to make quick money, riding an anticipated, lucrative 3-D boom. ... The producers didn't want to  fool around. They were looking for a more conventional approach. So, I wrote it like a Western with lots of straightforward heroics and a conventional orchestra, except for the Ondes Martenot."

Release
The film's advertising emphasized the 3D aspects. Columbia released Spacehunter on May 20, 1983, timed to be a week before Return of the Jedi.

It took $7 million in the first week However ticket sales dropped sharply. The film ended up grossing $16.5 million at the United States box office.

Hudson says he felt people went to the movie "and expected to see something different. If you don't have something really special and different, people just ask why they should spend money to see this thing? I don't think Spacehunter was daring enough; it wasn't really risky. We never lived up to our own publicity. It wasn't a bad story as movies go. And with Peter in it, I think people expected Spacehunter to be a serious film, and it wasn't serious at all."

While the film went mostly ignored at the U.S. box office, it did find some success on home video becoming the 10th best selling videocassette of 1983.

Reception
Variety called it "a muddled science fiction tale" whose editing prevented audiences from enjoying the well-shot action scenes.  Janet Maslin of The New York Times wrote that the film did more with its 3D than its contemporaries but was too crowded with derivative ideas to be memorable. Rotten Tomatoes gives the film an approval rating of 29% and average rating of 3.2/10 based on 14 reviews.

C.J. Henderson reviewed Spacehunter in Space Gamer No. 65. Henderson commented "Watch for this one when it is finally released to cable, or to the video stores. This is one of those movies one gets more from in the living-room than in the theatre."

In a 2015 interview, Ivan Reitman referred to the movie as "...a terrible movie in 3-D.."

Home media
The movie was released on DVD in the USA by Columbia/Tri-Star in December 2001. It was released on Blu-ray by Mill Creek Entertainment in the USA and Canada in May 2017 (without any supplemental features), by Via Vision Entertainment in Australia in March 2019, and by 101 Films in the UK in March 2020 (featuring a commentary with film historians Allan Bryce and Richard Holliss).

See also
 List of American films of 1983
 List of 3D films

References

External links

1983 films
1983 3D films
1983 comedy films
1980s road movies
1980s science fiction adventure films
1980s science fiction comedy films
1980s Western (genre) science fiction films
American Western (genre) science fiction films
American 3D films
American adventure comedy films
American science fiction comedy films
American space adventure films
American comedy road movies
1980s English-language films
Canadian Western (genre) science fiction films
Columbia Pictures films
Films directed by Lamont Johnson
Films produced by Don Carmody
Films scored by Elmer Bernstein
Films produced by John Dunning
Films set on fictional planets
Films shot in Utah
Films shot in Vancouver
Space Western films
Canadian 3D films
1980s American films
1980s Canadian films